Auratonota magnifica is a species of moth of the family Tortricidae. It is found in Venezuela.

The wingspan is about 33 mm. The ground colour of the forewings is yellowish cream, but yellow or ochreous yellow along edges. The markings are ferruginous. The hindwings are yellowish cream, tinged orange mainly along the margins. The species differs from all known Chlidanotini and resembles Cossula species.

References

Moths described in 2000
Auratonota
Moths of South America